The French Women's Volleyball Cup in (French: Coupe de France de Volleyball Féminin) is a French women's Volleyball competition contested every year since the year 1986 organized and ruled by the French Volleyball Federation (FFVB).

Competition history

Winners list

Honours by club

References

External links
   French Volleyball Federation  

Volleyball in France